VfB Stuttgart debuted in the modern-era 32-team Champions League with a progression from the group stage and a somewhat surprising victory with 2–1 against English champions Manchester United. Ultimately, the tournament ended with a narrow defeat to Chelsea. Kevin Kurányi, Philipp Lahm and Alexander Hleb were key players in a side that only just failed to finish in the top three for the second season in succession. Following an initial eight clean sheets, the attack suffered from only Kurányi being able to score, despite goalkeeper Timo Hildebrand keeping 18 clean sheets.

Players

First-team squad
Squad at end of season

Left club during season

Results

Bundesliga

 Hansa Rostock-VfB Stuttgart 0–2
 0–1 Imre Szabics 
 0–2 Imre Szabics 
 VfB Stuttgart-Hertha BSC 0–0
 Mönchengladbach-VfB Stuttgart 0–1
 0–1 Cacau 
 VfB Stuttgart-1. FC Kaiserslautern 2–0
 1–0 Cacau 
 2–0 Zvonimir Soldo 
 Schalke 04-VfB Stuttgart 0–0
 VfB Stuttgart-Borussia Dortmund 1–0
 1–0 Kevin Kurányi 
 1860 Munich-Stuttgart 0–3
 0–1 Zvonimir Soldo 
 0–2 Fernando Meira 
 0–3 Alexander Hleb 
 VfB Stuttgart-1. FC Köln 0–0
 Werder Bremen-VfB Stuttgart 1–3
 0–1 Imre Szabics 
 0–2 Kevin Kurányi 
 1–2 Angelos Charisteas 
 1–3 Christian Tiffert 
 VfB Stuttgart-VfL Wolfsburg 1–0
 1–0 Ioannis Amanatidis 
 VfB Stuttgart-SC Freiburg 4–1
 1–0 Kevin Kurányi 
 1–1 Soumaila Coulibaly 
 2–1 Christian Tiffert 
 3–1 Alexander Hleb 
 4–1 Kevin Kurányi 
 Eintracht Frankfurt-VfB Stuttgart 0–2
 0–1 Imre Szabics 
 0–2 Kevin Kurányi 
 VfB Stuttgart-Hannover 96 3–1
 1–0 Imre Szabics 
 2–0 Silvio Meißner 
 2–1 Thomas Brdarić 
 3–1 Silvio Meißner 
 VfL Bochum-VfB Stuttgart 0–0
 VfB Stuttgart-Hamburger SV 0–0
 Bayern Munich-VfB Stuttgart 1–0
 1–0 Roy Makaay 
 VfB Stuttgart-Bayer Leverkusen 2–3
 0–1 Carsten Ramelow 
 0–2 Dimitar Berbatov 
 1–2 Kevin Kurányi 
 1–3 Dimitar Berbatov 
 2–3 Zvonimir Soldo 
 VfB Stuttgart-Hansa Rostock 2–0
 1–0 Alexander Hleb 
 2–0 Kevin Kurányi 
 Hertha BSC-VfB Stuttgart 1–0
 1–0 Fredi Bobic 
 VfB Stuttgart-Borussia Mönchengladbach 1–1
 1–0 Imre Szabics 
 1–1 Václav Svěrkoš 
 1. FC Kaiserslautern-VfB Stuttgart 1–0
 1–0 José Dominguez 
 VfB Stuttgart-Schalke 04 0–0
 Borussia Dortmund-VfB Stuttgart 0–2
 0–1 Alexander Hleb 
 0–2 Horst Heldt 
 VfB Stuttgart-1860 München 2–0
 1–0 Zvonimir Soldo 
 2–0 Marco Streller 
 1. FC Köln-VfB Stuttgart 2–2
 0–1 Silvio Meißner 
 1–1 Florian Kringe 
 2–1 Markus Feulner 
 2–2 Matthias Scherz 
 VfB Stuttgart-Werder Bremen 4–4
 1–0 Marcelo Bordon 
 1–1 Ivan Klasnić 
 2–1 Marcelo Bordon 
 2–2 Ivan Klasnić 
 2–3 Aílton 
 3–3 Marcelo Bordon 
 4–3 Marco Streller 
 4–4 Aílton 
 SC Freiburg-VfB Stuttgart 1–5
 0–1 Heiko Gerber 
 0–2 Marco Streller 
 1–2 Martin Petrov 
 1–3 Philipp Lahm 
 1–4 Kevin Kurányi 
 1–5 Imre Szabics 
 SC Freiburg-VfB Stuttgart 0–1
 0–1 Kevin Kurányi 
 VfB Stuttgart-Eintracht Frankfurt 3–1
 1–0 Kevin Kurányi 
 2–0 Alexander Hleb 
 3–0 Marcelo Bordon 
 3–1 Alexander Schur 
 Hannover 96-VfB Stuttgart 0–1
 0–1 Silvio Meißner 
 VfB Stuttgart-VfL Bochum 1–1
 1–0 Cacau 
 1–1 Marcelo Bordon 
 Hamburger SV-VfB Stuttgart 2–1
 1–0 Stefan Beinlich 
 2–0 Nico-Jan Hoogma 
 2–1 Cacau 
 VfB Stuttgart-Bayern Munich 3–1
 1–0 Imre Szabics 
 2–0 Imre Szabics 
 3–0 Kevin Kurányi 
 3–1 Claudio Pizarro 
 Bayer Leverkusen-VfB Stuttgart 2–0
 1–0 Dimitar Berbatov 
 2–0 Bernd Schneider

Top scorers
  Kevin Kurányi 11
  Imre Szabics 9
  Alexander Hleb 5
  Cacau 4
  Zvonimir Soldo 4

Champions League

Group stage

 Rangers-VfB Stuttgart 2–1
 0–1 Kevin Kurányi 
 1–1 Christian Nerlinger 
 2–1 Peter Løvenkrands 
 VfB Stuttgart-Manchester United 2–1
 1–0 Imre Szabics 
 2–0 Kevin Kurányi 
 2–1 Ruud van Nistelrooy 
 VfB Stuttgart-Panathinaikos 2–0
 1–0 Imre Szabics 
 2–0 Zvonimir Soldo 
 Panathinaikos-VfB Stuttgart 1–3
 1–0 Michalis Konstantinou 
 1–1 Takis Fyssas 
 1–2 Kevin Kurányi 
 1–3 Andreas Hinkel 
 VfB Stuttgart-Rangers 1–0
 1–0 Timo Wenzel 
 Manchester United-VfB Stuttgart 2–0
 1–0 Ruud van Nistelrooy 
 2–0 Ryan Giggs

Last 16

 Stuttgart-Chelsea 0–1
 0–1 Fernando Meira 
 Chelsea-VfB Stuttgart 0–0

Reserve team

VfB Stuttgart II were coached by Reinhold Fanz and finished 11th in the Regionalliga Süd.

Sources
  Results & Fixtures for Stuttgart – Soocerbase.com

References

Notes

VfB Stuttgart seasons
Stuttgart